New Horizons is the UK government's ten-year strategy for mental health in England, published in December 2009. It replaces the National Service Framework for mental health, and is intended to be a comprehensive programme of action for improving the mental well-being of the population and the services that care for people with poor mental health by 2020.

New Horizons, along with other documents published simultaneously, is claimed to bring a new focus on employment issues, including new mental health coordinators for every Jobcentre Plus district, and occupational health advice lines for small businesses. The strategy also aims to tackle depression in people of all ages; to reduce suicides; to improve outreach to help excluded groups access support; and to tackle the stigma around mental illness.

Charities and mental health bodies have reportedly welcomed the strategy in general, but have expressed concerns about how to translate it into funded actions.

See also
National Mental Health Development Unit

References

External links
New Horizons document from the Department of Health

Mental health in England
Welfare in England
National Health Service (England)
Programmes of the Government of the United Kingdom
Public policy in England